Emma Freeman is an Australian director of television films and series. With her short film Lamb, in 2002 she was the first woman to win Tropfest.

Freeman graduated from the Victorian College of the Arts.

In 2002 she wrote, produced and directed a seven-minute film, Lamb, starring Robert Menzies and Orpheus Pledger. Lamb won Sydney's Tropfest that year, with Freeman being the first women director to win. In 2003 she directed Mittens for Tinderbox Films. Starring Sigrid Thornton, the film was shown at the 2003 Palm Springs International Short Film Festival and the 2004 London Australian Film Festival.

Early in her career Freeman worked with producer John Edwards.

Selected filmography

References

External links 

 
 
Blood and Ash, Freeman's 2000 short film

Living people
Year of birth missing (living people)
Victorian College of the Arts alumni